WTSW-LP (96.3 FM, "The Sustaining Word") is a radio station broadcasting a religious format. Licensed to Manitowoc, Wisconsin, United States, the station is currently owned by the Calvary Chapel of Manitowoc. The network is locally programmed with an affiliation with VCY America, and unrelated to the Calvary Radio Network across the Midwest.

References

External links
 
 

TSW-LP
TSW-LP
Manitowoc County, Wisconsin
VCY America stations
2017 establishments in Wisconsin
Radio stations established in 2017
Calvary Chapel Association